The Iowa Malleable Iron Company was a historic industrial complex located in Fairfield, Iowa, United States.  At one time the historic designation included nine buildings, most of them have been torn down.  The remaining building was the two-story office building for the factory that was constructed in 1924.  Most of the complex was built in 1904 north of the Chicago, Burlington and Quincy Railroad tracks.  The company produced malleable iron castings for agricultural implement manufacturers, including Fairfield's Louden Machinery Company.  For the most part it was established by the officers of the Louden Company, and it is thought to be the first foundry of its kind between the Mississippi River and Pueblo, Colorado.  The two companies maintained a close association throughout their histories.  The complex was listed on the National Register of Historic Places in 1999.

References

Buildings and structures completed in 1924
Buildings and structures in Jefferson County, Iowa
National Register of Historic Places in Jefferson County, Iowa
Industrial buildings and structures on the National Register of Historic Places in Iowa
Fairfield, Iowa